The Asylum is an American independent film company and distributor that focuses on producing low-budget, direct-to-video films. The company has produced titles that capitalize on productions by major studios, often using film titles and scripts very similar to those of current blockbusters in order to lure customers. These titles have been dubbed "mockbusters" by the press.

Films

1990–2000s

2010s

2020s

References 

Asylum